General Sir Reginald Ramsay Gipps,  (14 May 1831 – 10 September 1908) was a senior British Army officer who served as Military Secretary from 1892 until his retirement in 1896.

Military career
Born the only son of Major Sir George Gipps and educated at Eton College, Gipps was commissioned into the Scots Guards in 1849. He fought in the Crimean War at the Battle of Alma, where he was wounded by a bayonet in the hand, and the Battle of Inkerman, where he was wounded in the neck. He also took part in the Siege of Sevastopol. He was made commanding officer of the 1st Battalion Scots Guards in 1874, and of his regiment in 1878. He was given command of a brigade in Ireland in 1881. He went on to be Major General commanding the Brigade of Guards and General Officer Commanding the Home District in 1884, deputy adjutant-general for Auxiliary Forces in 1891 and Military Secretary in 1892.

He was also colonel of the Durham Light Infantry.

He lived at Sycamore Lodge in Farnborough.

Family
In 1886, he married Evelyn Charlotte Feilden and they went to have two sons and one daughter.

References

 

|-
 

1831 births
1908 deaths
British Army generals
British Army personnel of the Crimean War
Chevaliers of the Légion d'honneur
Knights Grand Cross of the Order of the Bath
People educated at Eton College
Scots Guards officers